Gary Moore was a musician from Belfast, Northern Ireland, best recognized as a blues rock guitarist and singer.

Gareth, Gar, Garry or Gary Moore may also refer to:

Performers
Garry Moore (1915–1993), American radio and TV personality
Gar Moore (1920–1985), American film and TV actor (1947's To Live in Peace)
Gary "Moses Mo" Moore, American guitarist in band Mother's Finest since 1970

Politicians
Garry Moore (South Dakota politician) (born 1949), American Democratic state legislator
Garry Moore (mayor) (born 1951), New Zealand mayor of Christchurch

Sportspeople
Gary Moore (baseball) (born 1945), American outfielder
Gary Moore (footballer, born 1945), English footballer who played for Southend United
Gary Moore (footballer, born 1968), English footballer who played for Maidstone United
Gareth Moore (born 1989), English rugby league footballer

Writers
Gareth Moore (theologian) (1948–2002), English author and Dominican friar
Gary W. Moore (born 1954), American author of Playing with the Enemy

See also
Gary Moore (album), Gary Moore's 1982 compilation album
Gerry Moore (1903–1993), English jazz pianist
Jerry Moore (disambiguation)